National Route 416 is a national highway of Japan connecting Fukui, Fukui and Komatsu, Ishikawa in Japan, with a total length of 86.3 km (53.62 mi).

References

National highways in Japan
Roads in Fukui Prefecture
Roads in Ishikawa Prefecture